Allianz Stadion is a football stadium which is built on the site of the former Gerhard Hanappi Stadium as the new home of SK Rapid Wien. In international matches the stadium has the no-commercial name Weststadion. Demolition of the old stadium began in early October 2014, after a ceremonial farewell with thousands of fans. By January 2015 almost nothing was left of the old stadium, which allowed foundation works for the new arena.

The stadium was officially unveiled when Rapid Wien hosted Chelsea in a pre-season friendly on 16 July 2016.

The first competitive match took place in the new stadium on 23 July 2016 when Rapid Vienna hosted SV Ried in the first round of the Austrian Football Bundesliga. Christoph Schößwendter scored the first competitive goal in the newly opened stadium in a 5–0 victory.

References
.

Sports venues in Vienna
Football venues in Austria
Buildings and structures in Penzing (Vienna)
SK Rapid Wien
Sports venues completed in 2016
2016 establishments in Austria
21st-century architecture in Austria